Antonio Santarelli (1569–1649) was an Italian Jesuit.

1569 births
1649 deaths
17th-century Italian Jesuits
Roman Catholic writers